Super_Collider consisted of Jamie Lidell and Cristian Vogel, formed in 1998. They released two albums – Head On in 1999, and Raw Digits in 2002.

This band should not be confused with the Los Angeles-based "post-rock" band of the early 1990s, Supercollider (Emigre Label).

Discography
Head On (1999)
Raw Digits (2002)

References

External links
 

English electronic music groups
Articles with underscores in the title